Héber Ansorena (14 August 1955 – 27 July 2020) was a sailor from Uruguay who represented his country at the 1988 Summer Olympics in Busan, South Korea as crew member in the Soling. With helmsman Horacio Carabelli and fellow crew members Luis Chiapparro they took the 16th place.

References

External links
 

1955 births
2020 deaths
Sailors at the 1988 Summer Olympics – Soling
Olympic sailors of Uruguay
Uruguayan male sailors (sport)